The United States District Court for the Northern District of Oklahoma (in case citations, N.D. Okla.) is a federal court in the Tenth Circuit (except for patent claims and claims against the U.S. government under the Tucker Act, which are appealed to the Federal Circuit).

The District was established on February 16, 1925, with the transfer of a judgeship in the Eastern District to the newly established Northern district.

Organization of the court 

The United States District Court for the Northern District of Oklahoma is one of three federal judicial districts in Oklahoma. Court for the District is held at Tulsa.

The court's jurisdiction comprises the following counties: Craig, Creek, Delaware, Mayes, Nowata, Osage, Ottawa, Pawnee, Rogers, Tulsa, and Washington.

The United States Attorney's Office for the Northern District of Oklahoma represents the United States in civil and criminal litigation in the court.  the United States Attorney for the Northern District of Oklahoma is Clint Johnson.

Current judges 
:

Vacancies and pending nominations

Former judges

Chief judges

Succession of seats

See also 
 Courts of Oklahoma
 List of current United States district judges
 List of United States federal courthouses in Oklahoma

References

External links 
 United States District Court for the Northern District of Oklahoma Official Website
 United States Attorney for the Northern District of Oklahoma Official Website

Oklahoma, Northern District
Oklahoma law
Tulsa, Oklahoma
1925 establishments in Oklahoma
Courthouses in Oklahoma
Courts and tribunals established in 1925